Scenarios is a duet album by pianist Andy Milne and harmonica player Grégoire Maret. It was released in 2007. It is Maret's first and only album as a co-leader to date (he later went on to record his own debut album in 2012). The album is primarily focused on originals and improvisations, and is a duet effort with the exception of Anne Drummond's alto flute on "Crystal Labyrinth" and Thelonious Monk Jazz Vocal Competition winner Gretchen Parlato adding vocals to the standard Moon River.

References 
AllMusic Review by Ken Dryden

2007 albums
Jazz albums by Canadian artists
Instrumental duet albums
Grégoire Maret albums